Summer's Children is a 1979 Canadian drama film directed by Julius Kohanyi and starring Thomas Hauff as Steve Linton, a man trying but failing to escape from his incestuous relationship with his sister Jennie (Paully Jardine).

The cast also includes Kate Lynch as Kathy, Steve's new girlfriend; Don Francks as Albert, a bookie who becomes Steve's guide to the new life he's trying to build for himself; and Patricia Collins as Elaine, a bisexual artist who has had sex with both Steve and Jennie; and Michael Ironside in a small role as a pimp.

Cast
 Thomas Hauff as Steve Linton
 Paully Jardine as Jennie Linton
 Don Francks as Albert
 Kate Lynch as Kathy
 Patricia Collins as Elaine
 Richard Eden as Mechanic
 Kay Hawtrey as Mrs. Baines
 Michael Ironside as Pimp
 Brian Miller as Fred

Reception
The film received three Genie Award nominations at the 1st Genie Awards in 1980: Best Actor (Hauff), Best Supporting Actress (Collins) and Best Original Screenplay (Jim Osborne). Sid Adilman of the Toronto Star singled out Francks' failure to receive a Best Supporting Actor nomination as one of the biggest oversights of the entire awards ceremony.

The film won an award for Best First Feature at the Texas International Film Festival. It received only limited theatrical distribution in Canada, and was instead seen primarily as a television film on CBC Television.

References

External links

1979 films
Canadian drama films
English-language Canadian films
Films about siblings
Films shot in Toronto
Incest in film
Canadian LGBT-related films
1979 LGBT-related films
LGBT-related drama films
1970s English-language films
1970s Canadian films